The Chapel of Santisima Virgen de Lujan or the Chapel of the Blessed Virgin of Lujan  is a Roman Catholic chapel located at the Argentine base Marambio on Seymour-Marambio Island in Antarctica. It is the third most southern place of worship of any religion. It is one of eight churches on Antarctica. The permanent steel-structured chapel is used for Christian worship by the various Argentine personnel on station (as well as visitors).  The chapel features a bell tower and cross.

See also
Religion in Antarctica

References

James Ross Island group
Roman Catholic chapels in Antarctica